Lonnie Dean Nielsen (June 29, 1953 – January 20, 2021) was an American professional golfer.

Nielsen was born and raised in Belle Plaine, Iowa. His father started him in golf as a youngster on the sand green courses in and around his hometown. He attended the University of Iowa, where he earned a Bachelor of Business Administration degree in 1976.

Nielsen was a member of the PGA Tour from 1978–1983 but did not win any tournaments. He has won over 30 other tournaments though, most of which were played in New York.

Nielsen became a member of the Champions Tour upon reaching the age of 50 in the summer of 2003. He won his first Champions Tour event at the Commerce Bank Championship in 2007. His second Champions Tour win came in 2009 at the Dick's Sporting Goods Open, where he came from three strokes behind Fred Funk in the final round with a 9 under par 63 to win by three strokes.

In 2009, Nielsen became the first tour professional to serve as a lead contributor to the GIVE (Golf For Injured Veterans Everywhere) Foundation.

Nielsen was inducted into the Iowa Golf Hall of Fame in 2010. He was inducted into the Greater Buffalo Sports Hall of Fame in 2018. Nielsen died on January 20, 2021; he had dementia in the years prior to his death.

Professional wins (39)

Regular career wins (35)
1979 Waterloo Open Golf Classic
1984 Western New York PGA Match Play Championship
1985 New York State Open, Western New York Section PGA Championship
1986 Western New York PGA Match Play Championship, Western New York Section PGA Championship
1987 Western New York Section PGA Championship
1988 PGA Match Play Championship, PGA Stroke Play Championship
1989 New York State Open, Western New York Open, Western New York Section PGA Championship, PGA Match Play Championship
1990 Western New York Open, Western New York PGA Match Play Championship, Western New York Section PGA Championship
1991 Western New York PGA Match Play Championship
1993 Western New York PGA Match Play Championship, Western New York Open, Western New York Section PGA Championship
1994 Western New York PGA Match Play Championship, Western New York Section PGA Championship
1995 Western New York Open
1996 Western New York Section PGA Championship
1997 Western New York Open
1998 Western New York Open, Western New York PGA Match Play Championship
1999 Western New York PGA Match Play Championship
2000 Western New York Section PGA Championship
2001 Western New York PGA Match Play Championship
2002 Western New York PGA Match Play Championship, Western New York Open
2003 Western New York Open
2013 Western New York Section PGA Championship, Western New York PGA Match Play Championship

Champions Tour wins (2)

Champions Tour playoff record (0–1)

Other senior wins (2)
2003 Otesago Senior Open Championship, Turning Stone Seniors Championship

Results in major championships

CUT = missed the half-way cut
"T" = tied
Note: Nielsen never played in the Masters Tournament or The Open Championship.

U.S. national team appearances
PGA Cup: 1988 (winners), 1996 (tie)

See also
1982 PGA Tour Qualifying School graduates

References

External links

American male golfers
PGA Tour golfers
PGA Tour Champions golfers
Golfers from Iowa
Golfers from Florida
Golfers from New York (state)
People from Belle Plaine, Iowa
People from Palm Beach Gardens, Florida
People from Orchard Park, New York
1953 births
2021 deaths